Reification may refer to:

Science and technology
 Reification (computer science), the creation of a data model
 Reification (knowledge representation), the representation of facts and/or assertions
 Reification (statistics), the use of an idealized model to make inferences linking results from a model with experimental observations

Other uses
 Reification (fallacy), the fallacy of treating an abstraction as if it were a real thing
 Reification (Gestalt psychology), the perception of an object as having more spatial information than is present 
 Reification (linguistics), the transformation of a natural-language statement such that actions and events represented by it become quantifiable variables
 Reification (Marxism), the consideration of an abstraction of an object as if it had living existence and abilities

See also
 Concretization
 Objectification, the treatment of an entity (such as a human or animal) as an object